Harvey Creek is a stream in the U.S. state of Wisconsin. It is a tributary to the Wisconsin River.

Harvey Creek is named after R. Harvey, a local landowner.

References

Rivers of Wood County, Wisconsin
Rivers of Wisconsin